David Phillips (born 25 May 1966) is a Canadian former international soccer player who played as a striker.

University career
Phillips attended the University of Alberta, playing for the Alberta Golden Bears from 1986-1990, where he set the school record for goals with 23, holding the record until 2011 when it was broken by Brett Colvin.

Club career 
In 1986, he played for the Edmonton Brick Men in the Western Soccer Alliance.

Phillips played in the Canadian Soccer League with Calgary Kickers in 1987, making two appearances in the playoffs. He re-signed with Calgary for the 1988 season, scoring three goals in 25 regular season matches, and scoring once in one playoff match.

He returned to the Brick Men in 1989, but did not make any appearances.

International career
Phillips made his Canada U20 debut on August 20, 1984 against Guatemala at the 1984 CONCACAF U-20 Tournament. He scored his first goal on August 24 against Cuba and also scored in the tournament final against Mexico in a 2-1 loss.

He made his senior team debut on October 21, 1984 in a friendly against Tunisia.

References

1966 births
Living people
Canadian soccer players
Canada men's international soccer players
Association football forwards
Calgary Kickers players
Edmonton Brick Men players
Canadian Soccer League (1987–1992) players
Canada men's youth international soccer players
Alberta Golden Bears players